Pfitzneriella lucicola is a moth of the family Hepialidae. It is found in Ecuador.

References

Moths described in 1890
Hepialidae